Pagliata (or, in Roman dialect, Pajata) is a traditional Roman dish primarily using the intestine of a young calf (Tripe). As it has only eaten milk, the resulting dish is similar to cheese in a sausage casing.

It is usually plaited for serving.

Characteristic 
It is of traditional use in Roman cuisine. The traditional recipe requires the intestine to be washed, but not deprived of the chyme so that, once cooked, it can give shape to a sauce with a sharp and strong flavor, to which the tomato is added.

Pagliata is also consumed in Umbria, especially in the area of Terni, Spoleto, Foligno and the Valnerina, and in the Marche, in particular in the area of Ancona, Camerino, Fabriano and Macerata, where it is cooked on the grill and is traditionally known as the name spuntature.

The classic preparation includes pagliata accompanied by rigatoni con la pajata, but it can also be eaten as a second course cooked in the oven, stewed, or grilled.

References

External links
 Lazio Property Sale – Gastronomy in the Lazio region

Offal
Italian cuisine